Kenton in Hi-Fi is an album by bandleader and pianist Stan Kenton featuring performances of Kenton's signature compositions from the 1940s recorded in 1956 and released on the Capitol label. This album was re-released as 'Kenton in Stereo' in 1959. A 7-1/2 i.p.s.stereo reel tape - Catalog no. ZDS -10 - was recorded by Capitol and released in 1956. Apparently the stereo mix for the reel tape is unique, but the same stereo master tape was probably used for the stereo vinyl LP record.

Reception

The Allmusic review by Stephen Cook noted "Thanks to a seamless mix of dazzling charts and liberal doses of Lunceford and Ellington-inspired swing, the marriage certainly works on Kenton in Hi-Fi. Old hits like "Eager Beaver" and "Artistry In Boogie" sparkle in the warm glow of '50s stereo technology, while fiery renditions of "Lover" and "The Peanut Vendor" show the famous muscle of the Kenton band. ...one can see why this album was not only one of Kenton's most popular releases, but a critical success as well".

Track listing
All compositions by Stan Kenton except where noted.
 "Artistry Jumps" - 2:38
 "Interlude" (Pete Rugolo) - 3:06
 "Intermission Riff" (Ray Wetzel) - 4:15
 "Minor Riff" (Rugolo, Kenton) - 3:03
 "Collaboration" (Rugolo, Kenton) - 2:40
 "Painted Rhythm" - 3:04
 "Southern Scandal" - 3:06
 "The Peanut Vendor" (Moises Simons) - 4:36
 "Eager Beaver" - 3:24
 "Concerto to End All Concertos" - 7:04
 "Artistry in Boogie" (Rugolo, Kenton) - 2:38
 "Lover" (Richard Rodgers, Lorenz Hart) - 2:33
 "Unison Riff" (Rugolo) - 3:11

Personnel
Stan Kenton - piano, conductor
Pete Candoli, Maynard Ferguson, Ed Leddy, Sam Noto, Don Paladino - trumpet (tracks 1 & 3-13)
Milt Bernhart, Bob Fitzpatrick, Carl Fontana, Kent Larsen - trombone
Don Kelly - bass trombone
Skeets Herfurt, Lennie Niehaus - alto saxophone  (tracks 1 & 3-13)
Vido Musso, Bill Perkins, Spencer Sinatra - tenor saxophone  (tracks 1 & 3-13)
Jack Nimitz - baritone saxophone  (tracks 1 & 3-13)
Ralph Blaze - guitar
Don Bagley - bass
Mel Lewis - drums
Frank “Chico” Guerrero - timbales, bongos (tracks 8 & 13)
Stan Kenton (tracks 1 & 6-9), Pete Rugolo (tracks 2, 4, 5 & 10-13), Ray Wetzel (track 3) - arranger

References

Stan Kenton albums
1956 albums
Capitol Records albums
Albums arranged by Pete Rugolo
Albums conducted by Stan Kenton
Albums produced by Lee Gillette